The Wissahickon Memorial Bridge, originally called and still also known as the Henry Avenue Bridge, is a stone and concrete bridge that carries Henry Avenue over Wissahickon Creek and Lincoln Drive in Fairmount Park in Philadelphia, Pennsylvania.

History 
It is a two-ribbed, open-spandrel, reinforced concrete arch bridge with one principal span. It was designed in 1927 by Paul Philippe Cret, a nationally acclaimed Philadelphia architect, in collaboration with Frank M. Masters, engineered by Ralph Modjeski and Clement E. Chase. 

It was completed in May 1932 at a cost of $1,648,775. It was designed to accommodate a lower deck, never constructed, to be used by trolleys or a subway extension to Roxborough. Shortly after its completion, it was renamed the Wissahickon Memorial Bridge and was dedicated to the people of Philadelphia's northwest neighborhoods who served in World War I.

The bridge is 333 feet long, with a main span of 288 feet. Its 60-ft-wide roadway carries two lanes of traffic in each direction. The roadway is approximately 170 feet above the ground. The bridge was repaved and repaired between 2008 and late 2010.

The bridge has been known as a suicide bridge since its opening. Beginning in 1941 for an unknown duration of time a policeman patrolled the span, questioning all pedestrians walking the bridge.

It was listed on the National Register of Historic Places in 1988. The bridge was featured as a filming location in the 1981 film Blow Out starring John Travolta and directed by Brian De Palma.

See also

List of bridges documented by the Historic American Engineering Record in Pennsylvania
Walnut Lane Bridge

References

External links

Chronology and images at Philadelphia Architects and Buildings

Bridges on the National Register of Historic Places in Philadelphia
Bridges completed in 1932
Historic American Engineering Record in Philadelphia
Philadelphia Register of Historic Places
Wissahickon Valley Park
Bridges in Philadelphia
Road bridges on the National Register of Historic Places in Pennsylvania
1932 establishments in Pennsylvania
Concrete bridges in the United States
Stone bridges in the United States
Open-spandrel deck arch bridges in the United States